Robert Blum (November 24, 1928 – November 27, 2022) was an American Olympic fencer.

Early and personal life
Blum was born in Pittsburgh, Pennsylvania, and was Jewish. He attended Columbia Law School, and practiced law for 50 years.  His wife was Barbara Blum, who became a high-ranking social services official. Blum became an aide to John Lindsay, first in Congress and then at City Hall in New York City, and later was one of New York Governor  Andrew Cuomo’s NYS Assistant Attorneys General.

Blum died on November 27, 2022, at the age of 94.

Fencing career
Blum attended and fenced first as an All American for Trinity College, and then for Columbia University. He also fenced for Salle Santelli and the Fencers Club in New York, winning the US Saber Team title 10 times with the two clubs, combined. He was a member of the U.S. sabre team that won the gold medal at the 1959 Pan American Games.

Blum was the first American to make the World Championship individual saber finals, when he did that at the 1958 World Fencing Championships. Blum competed on behalf of the United States in the team sabre events at the 1964 Summer Olympics in Tokyo and the 1968 Summer Olympics in Mexico City. He was inducted into the USA Fencing Hall of Fame in 2010.

References

External links
 

1928 births
2022 deaths
American male sabre fencers
Olympic fencers of the United States
Fencers at the 1964 Summer Olympics
Fencers at the 1968 Summer Olympics
Sportspeople from Pittsburgh
Pan American Games medalists in fencing
Pan American Games gold medalists for the United States
Columbia Law School alumni
New York Law School alumni
Jewish American sportspeople
Jewish male sabre fencers
Fencers at the 1959 Pan American Games
21st-century American Jews
Medalists at the 1959 Pan American Games